Virginia Helen McCord Mecklenburg (born November 11, 1946) is an American art historian and curator. Mecklenburg is currently the Senior Curator of Painting and Sculpture at the Smithsonian American Art Museum, where she has worked since 1979.

Career
Mecklenburg received two English degrees from the University of Texas at Austin: a Bachelor of Arts in 1968 and a Master of Arts in 1970. Her master's thesis was titled "An Analysis of Role Playing as a Method of Teaching English to the Disadvantaged Learner." Mecklenburg then continued on to the University of Maryland to earn a Doctor of Philosophy in Art History in 1983. While studying in Maryland, she was hired as a curator at the Smithsonian American Art Museum in 1979. Mecklenburg wrote a doctoral dissertation titled "American Aesthetic Theory, 1908-1917: Issues in Conservative and Avant-Garde Thought," supervised by Professor Elizabeth Johns.

A scholar of American art, Mecklenburg has written publications on such artists as George Bellows, Richard Estes, William Glackens, Edward Hopper, Robert Indiana, Georgia O'Keeffe, John Sloan, and Robert Vickrey.

See also
List of University of Maryland, College Park people
List of University of Texas at Austin alumni

References

External links
Smithsonian profile

1946 births
Living people
21st-century American women
American art curators
American women curators
University of Texas at Austin alumni
University of Maryland, College Park alumni
Smithsonian Institution people